Housecoat Project was an avant-garde punk rock band started in 1984 in San Francisco, California, by Meri St. Mary, Eric Rad Yuncker, Michel Schorro and Erol Cengiz. The band opened for many punk bands of the time and was a headline act at many clubs. 

Housecoat Project was part of the New Music Seminar in New York City, and then toured nationally sponsored in part by Jägermeister Music Tour. The death of Yuncker on stage at Mabuhay Gardens led to a hiatus when St. Mary reformed the band to record Wide Eye Doo Dat on Subterranean Records (SUB 61). Housecoat Project's second release on Subterranean Records, Girlfriend (SUB 66), was released 23 years after its recording. The records received critical acclaim and the band was well known for its live performances. 

In 2012, St. Mary reunited the band after 20 years with Jay Crawford, Bob Bartosik, Mike Sims and Whitey Cox. Housecoat Project played at the opening of the Punk Rock Museum in Los Angeles, The Eagle in & out of exile with the Sisters of Perpetual Indulgence, the Punk Rock Museum in San Francisco and Nevada City. Wide Eye Doo Dat is out of print and the test pressing for Girlfriend has limited availability. The band's LPs use local artists for the visuals. The Brotherhood of Light was an early supporter, doing light shows at the Mab. Housecoat Project played at the Folsom Street Fair, the I-Beam nightclub, The Farm, The Kommotion, The Chatterbox, San Francisco Music Works, The Baybrick Inn and The Sound of Music as well as open public performances. The band opened for Flipper, The Mutants, Frightwig, Richard Hell, The Skanking Babylonians, The Beatnigs, Faith No More, Ugly Stick and other bands. Robert Christgau of Village Voice gave them a "B". The band is planning more shows in the near future.

References

Punk rock groups from California
Musical groups from San Francisco